Karay is a Turkish surname. Notable people with the surname include:

 Hacı Karay (1950–1994), Turkish drug trafficker
Refik Halit Karay (1888–1965), Turkish educator, writer, and journalist

See also

Karey (disambiguation)
Karly

Turkish-language surnames